This is a list of American-style colleges and universities outside the United States. It is meant to include only free-standing universities or satellite campuses, not programs by which one may study abroad at a non-American university.

American-style colleges and universities outside the United States

Notes

See also 
 American College
 American University (disambiguation)

References

External links
 Association of American International Colleges and Universities website

American
Universities, Abroad